Anahita Ratebzad (Persian/; November 1931 – 7 September 2014) was an Afghan socialist and Marxist-Leninist politician and a member of the People's Democratic Party of Afghanistan (PDPA) and the Revolutionary Council under the leadership of Babrak Karmal. One of the first women elected to the Afghan parliament, Ratebzad was deputy head of state from 1980 to 1986.

Early life and education 
Ratebzad was born in Guldara in Kabul Province. Her father was an advocate of Amanullah Khan's reforms. This led to his forced exile following the events of 1929 to Iran under the ruling period of Nader Khan. Ratezbad and her brother grew up without their father under poor conditions. She was married off at the age of 15 to Dr. Keramuddin Kakar, one of the very few foreign-educated Afghan surgeons of the time. Ratebzad had attended the francophone Malalaï Lycée in Kabul. She received a degree in nursing from the State University of Michigan, School of Nursing from 1950 to 1954. As Kabul University's Medical School allowed women to enroll for Medicine, she belonged to the first batch and graduated in 1962.

Her political involvement led to an estrangement between her and her husband, Dr. Keramuddin Kakar, who did not approve of her political views and activities as he was considered loyal to Zahir Shah. Ratebzad moved out of their marital house in 1973. Though they never divorced officially, they lived separately and avoided contact. They had three children, one daughter and two sons. Only her daughter followed her political path and became a member of People's Democratic Party of Afghanistan (PDPA); her sons remained critical of her political activities and decisions.

Political life 
Ratebzad was one of the first publicly outspoken social and political Afghan-women activists in the late 1950s and most of 60s in Afghanistan. She was also part of the first ever Afghan-women delegation representing the Kingdom of Afghanistan on international stage at the Asian Women's Conference in Ceylon in 1957.

As veiling became optional  during the tenure of Daud Khan as prime minister, Ratebzad led a group of female nurses in 1957 to  Kabul's Aliabad Hospital to attend male patients. This marked the uncovering of women's faces for working purpose in urban Afghanistan. However, this and other events to follow led to her defamation in conservative circles of Afghan society.

Ratebzad founded the Democratic Organisation of Afghan Women (DOAW) in 1964. The organisation did not follow a specific political ideology; in 2013 Rahnaward Zaryab wrote that "DOAW was an organisation founded in the 1340s (1960s CE) which was not foreign funded or supported. The members of the organisation were intellectual women volunteering to promote and work for women's rights on their own initiative." Comparing DOAW with present-day women's rights organisations inside Afghanistan, he added "they lack the outreach and effectiveness of DOAW." However, after the Saur Revolution of 1978 the organisation came under the supervision of the PDPA governmental. During the Khalq faction's power seizure it was headed by Dilaram Mahak from 1978 to 1979. After the power seizure by the Parcham faction, Ratebzad was elected as the chairwoman of DOAW at DOAW's general assembly in 1980.

Ratebzad along with other members of DOAW organised a protest march on 8 March 1965 in Kabul marking the first celebration of  International Women's Day in Afghanistan.

She became involved in leftist politics and, along with Khadija Ahrari, Masuma Esmati Wardak, and Roqia Abubakr, was one of the first four women elected to Afghan parliament in 1965, winning the Second District Kabul City seat. In 1965 Ratebzad helped found the People's Democratic Party of Afghanistan (PDPA) becoming part of the Parcham faction. Her political views on women's right and her marxist political ideology made her a highly controversial figure, especially among other political parties and forces. Her close association with Babrak Karmal, the leader of the Parcham faction, brought her the label of "Karmal's mistress", some incorrect sources even counted him as her husband. She did not contest the 1969 elections, losing her seat in parliament.

In the days leading to the Saur Revolution/ Coup d'état on 28–29 April 1978, Ratebzad was detained under house arrest in her apartment in Makroyan, while Karmal Ghulam Dastagir Panjsheri , Nur Muhammad Taraki and Saleh Mohammad Zeary were imprisoned and other PDPA prominent members (Khalq and Parcham) had gone underground. As the Khalq wing of PDPA seized power and Taraki became president, she was appointed as Minister of Social Affairs. She served at the post for four months.

Ratebzad wrote the 28 May 1978 Kabul New Times editorial which declared: "Privileges which women, by right, must have are equal education, job security, health services, and free time to rear a healthy generation for building the future of the country ... Educating and enlightening women is now the subject of close government attention ".

The two factions of Khalq and Parcham soon fell out again and prominent Parchamites, including Ratebzad, were appointed as ambassadors. Ratebzad served as ambassador to Belgrade (1978–1980). She was dismissed from her post as Hafizullah Amin came to power, who also launched a purge on Parchamites. After the Soviet invasion of Afghanistan and power seizure by the Parcham wing, she was appointed as Minister of Education (1980–1981) and became permanent member of the PDPA's Politburo. In this position she had the responsibility of overseeing several Ministries, including Higher and Vocational Education, Information and Cultural, and Public Health.

After Karmal was replaced by Mohammad Najibullah in 1986, who aimed at distancing himself from his leftist past and Marxist rhetoric upon Soviet advice, Ratebzad was discharged of her posts and withdrew from the Politburo. She was replaced as head of DOAW by Firuzah Wardak.

Migration, later life and death 
After 1986 she remained in Afghanistan until May 1992. Ratebzad and some members of her family were forced to escape the Mujahideen in-fighting. In 1995 she left for Sofia, Bulgaria and a year later after seeking political asylum, settled in Lünen, Germany. Ratebzad died of kidney failure at the age of 82. Her remains were taken back to Afghanistan and were buried in Kabul's Shohada-e-Sa'alehin.

References

Arnold, Anthony. Afghanistan's Two-Party Communism: Parcham and Khalq. Stanford, CA: Hoover Institution Press, 1983.

Afghan feminists
Afghan socialists
Afghan secularists
Afghan physicians
1931 births
2014 deaths
People's Democratic Party of Afghanistan politicians
Members of the House of the People (Afghanistan)
Communist government ministers of Afghanistan
Afghan women physicians
Ambassadors of Afghanistan to Yugoslavia
Afghan exiles
Afghan expatriates in India
Afghan expatriates in Bulgaria
Afghan expatriates in Germany
Women government ministers of Afghanistan
Afghan women ambassadors
20th-century Afghan women politicians
20th-century Afghan politicians